Edward E. "Blue" Howell (1905 – April 15, 1964) was an American football player and coach.  He was the fifth head football coach at Kansas State Teachers College of Pittsburg—now known as Pittsburg State University—in Pittsburg, Kansas, serving for eight seasons, from 1929 to 1935 and again in 1937, compiling a record of 35–30–6.

Playing career
Howell played college football at the University of Nebraska–Lincoln under head coach Ernest E. Bearg from 1926 until 1928.  Weighing 185 pounds, he was the lightest member of the Cornhuskers but was considered one of the best fullbacks in the Big Six Conference.  He was inducted into the program's "Hall of Fame" in 1978.

Death
Howell died of a heart attack in 1964 at his home in Omaha, Nebraska.

Head coaching record

References

1905 births
1964 deaths
American football fullbacks
Nebraska Cornhuskers football players
Pittsburg State Gorillas football coaches